Kerala Seaplane was a commercial seaplane service promoted by Kerala Tourism Infrastructure Limited in the Indian state of Kerala. It was launched on 2 June 2013 at Kollam with the inaugural flight being operated by Kairali Aviation. However, commercial operations could not start due to opposition from the local fishing community. The Kerala Government was keen on restarting regular operations of the project in 2014.
The service was to be the first such service in mainland India, and the second in India after Jal Hans, which operates seaplanes in the Andaman and Nicobar Islands. Work on the Kerala seaplane project began at the end of July, 2012 and has been praised for being one of the fastest projects to be completed in Kerala.

Structure & working
The role of the Kerala Government was only that of a facilitator and regulator. Kerala Tourism was to do the work of marketing and promotion. Facilities like water dromes and floating jetties have already been built by the Kerala Government at Ashtamudi, Kumarakom, Vembanad and Bekal. These are the four initial tourist spots being connected by the seaplane. These facilities will also be constructed at 21 other tourist spots (including Paravur) later. Houseboats have been deployed at the take-off and landing places for seaplanes and are equipped with special lounges for tourists.

The fares for the seaplane services were fixed by the operators and the seaplane services were to be operated by five operators — Bharat Aviation, Kairali Aviation, Mehair, Pawan Hans and Wings Aviation — from 10am to 5pm. The rate for the flight had been announced as 6000 per hour, subject to change. Refuelling and maintenance of the seaplanes were to be done at their respective base-station airports and not at the waterdromes to prevent any harm to marine ecology.

Inauguration

The service was launched on 2 June 2013 by Chief Minister of Kerala Oommen Chandy in the backwaters of the Ashtamudi Lake in Kollam district using a 5+1 seater Cessna 206H amphibian aircraft. The inaugural flight took off on time, but landed back at Ashtamudi after flying for a short distance due to bad weather. It was to be officially launched for tourists in August 2013.

Kerala's Minister for Tourism, A.P. Anil Kumar, had announced that four more companies would launch services from the Thiruvananthapuram, Kochi, Kozhikode and Mangalore airports to backwaters in Kollam, Alappuzha, Ernakulam and Kasargode districts by the end of 2013.

Reactions
The inaugural launch received a mixed response with protests by two Left backed organisations of traditional fishermen who claimed that the seaplane service was a threat to their livelihood and marine ecology. Owing to protests, the seaplane was forced to change its landing location. But, Mr. Anil Kumar said, "The fishing community in Kollam has given its approval to the tourism project. Now, we will speak to the community at Alappuzha to convince them that it will not threaten their profession." The government, however, constituted a committee to study the impact of the seaplane operations on the livelihood of the local fishing community

The aircraft remained grounded at the Cochin international airport at Nedumbaserry since 3 June. The expert committee was unable to submit its final report even towards the end of the year. Kairali Aviation, unable to cope with the mounting losses and the uncertainty of restarting the service, returned the aircraft back to its lessor.

Domestic Destinations 

Kerala
Kochi International Airport 
Calicut International Airport
Trivandrum International Airport 
Kollam
Bekal
Astamudi
Ernakulam
Kasargode
Alappuzha
Karnataka
Mangalore International Airport

See also
 List of airlines of India

References

External links
 Wings Aviation website

Proposed airlines of India
Defunct airlines of India 
Transport in Kollam
Airlines established in 2013
Airlines disestablished in 2013
Seaplane operators